Ferenc Kállai (4 October 1925 – 11 July 2010) was a Hungarian film actor. He appeared in more than one hundred films from 1952 to 2007.

Selected filmography

References

External links
 

1925 births
2010 deaths
Hungarian male film actors